Teresa Sampsonia (born Sampsonia; after marriage Lady Shirley, 1589–1668) was a noblewoman of the Safavid Empire of Iran. She was the wife of Elizabethan English adventurer Robert Shirley, whom she accompanied on his travels and embassies across Europe in the name of the Safavid King (Shah) Abbas the Great (1588–1629).

Teresa was received by many of the royal houses of Europe, such as English prince Henry Frederick and Queen Anne (her child's godparents) and contemporary writers and artists such as Thomas Herbert and Anthony van Dyck. Herbert considered Robert Shirley "the greatest Traveller of his time", but admired the "undaunted Lady Teresa" even more. Following the death of her husband from dysentery in 1628, and due to impediments from grandees at the court, and the authorities, during the reign of Abbas's successor and grandson Safi (1629–1642), Teresa decided to leave Iran. She lived in a convent in Rome for the rest of her life, devoting her time to charity and religion. As a pious Christian, and because of her love for her husband, Teresa had Shirley's remains transported to Rome from Isfahan and reburied; on the headstone of their mutual grave she mentions their travels and refers to her noble Circassian origins. 

Thanks to her exploits, Teresa has been described as someone who subverted patriarchal gender roles common to the Muslim and Christian cultures of her time. Due to their hybrid identities and adventures, Teresa and her husband became the subject of several contemporary literary and visual works. Nevertheless, the story of Teresa as an important woman of the 17th century has been largely overshadowed and obscured by the tale of her husband Robert and his brothers.

Sources
The travels of Teresa and Robert Shirley were recorded in many contemporaneous English, Italian, Latin and Spanish sources, including eyewitness accounts. According to Penelope Tuson, the main sources that deal with Teresa's life are the "predictably semi-hagiographic" accounts stored in the archives of the Vatican and the Carmelite order. These Vatican and Carmelite sources were compiled, edited and published by Herbert Chick in 1939 in his Chronicle of the Carmelites in Persia. Though the Chronicle of the Carmelites in Persia evidently portrays a positive image of Teresa, Tuson notes that the accounts are "patchy" and "contradictory" on some occasions. Furthermore, the narrative is considered to be from the viewpoint of European Catholicism. Other sources that help create a modern scholarly account of Teresa include the only document she is known to have written in English (a petition to King James I of England 1603–1625), paintings, and to a lesser extent, official letters signed by King (Shah) Abbas the Great (1588–1629).

Early life and marriage

Teresa was born in 1589 into a noble Orthodox Christian Circassian family in the Safavid Empire, ruled at the time by Shah Abbas the Great. She was named Sampsonia at birth. The daughter of Ismail Khan, a brother-in-law of the King, she grew up in Isfahan in the Iranian royal court as a reportedly beautiful, accomplished horsewoman who enjoyed embroidery and painting.

Robert Shirley was an English adventurer who was sent to the Safavids, after a Persian embassy was sent to Europe, to forge an alliance against the neighbouring Ottoman Empire, rivals of the Safavids. During his attendance at court, Teresa met him and fell in love. On 2 February 1608, with the approval of her aunt and Abbas, Teresa married Robert Shirley in Iran. At about the time of their wedding, she was baptised as a Roman Catholic by the Carmelites in Isfahan with the name Teresa. Her baptismal name derives from the founder of the Discalced Carmelites, Teresa of Ávila.

Travels

First mission

Teresa accompanied Robert on his diplomatic missions for Shah Abbas to England and other royal houses in Europe. When they set off on their first embassy trip, Robert was captured by his enemies. Teresa reportedly managed to save him and put to flight the attackers; for this, the Carmelite records praised her as "a true Amazon". Teresa and Shirley visited the Grand Duke of Muscovy Vasili IV, Pope Paul V in Rome and King Sigismund III of Poland. In Poland, Teresa lived in a convent in Kraków for some time while her husband visited Prague, where Emperor Rudolph II (1576–1612) bestowed on him the title of Count Palatine. He arrived in Rome on 27 September 1609 and met Ali Qoli Beg, Abbas I's ambassador, with whom he had an audience with the Pope. Shirley then left for Savoy, Florence, Milan, Genoa, France, Flanders and Spain (Barcelona and Madrid). Teresa rejoined him in Lisbon via Hamburg. They then went to Valladolid and Madrid where Teresa came to know the Carmelite nuns, particularly Mother Beatrix de Jesus (the niece of Saint Teresa) from whom she received a relic of Teresa.

Teresa and Shirley left for the Dutch Republic and subsequently sailed from Bayonne to England, where they arrived around the beginning of August 1611. Their only child, a son named Henry, in all likelihood the first English-born child of Iranian descent according to Sheila R. Canby, was born in November 1611 at the Shirley home in Sussex. His godparents were Henry Frederick, Prince of Wales, for whom he was named, and Queen Anne. Teresa and Robert remained in England a little over a year. Before departing from Gravesend to Safavid Iran in 1612–1613, they decided to turn young Henry over to Robert's family in Sussex. He is believed to have survived until at least 1622, but to have died at a young age. Teresa and Shirley's two-and-a-half-year return voyage to Iran proved to be extremely difficult. On one occasion, they were almost killed at sea. On another, during their short stop in Mughal India to meet Emperor Jahangir (1605–1627), hostile Portuguese tried to assassinate the couple. The couple remained in Iran for a few months, before embarking on their second embassy.

Second mission
On their last mission, Teresa and Robert arrived in Lisbon through Goa on 27 September 1617. They headed towards Madrid, where they stayed until March 1622, then went to Florence and Rome. During this last brief visit to Rome between 22 July and 29 August 1622, Anthony van Dyck (then 23 years old) painted their portraits. The couple then went to Warsaw in Poland, and perhaps Moscow afterwards, before visiting England in 1623 for the last time. They sailed for the Safavid Empire in 1627 on an East India Company ship with Dodmore Cotton, an envoy from the King of England to Persia and other courts. Teresa and Robert returned to Isfahan through Surat and Bandar Abbas. The couple then moved to Qazvin (the former capital of Safavid Iran) where the king rewarded them with valuable gifts. Shirley and Cotton became seriously ill with fever (probably dysentery), shortly after their arrival.

Departure from Safavid kingdom
Shirley and Teresa were troubled by the jealousy of several nobles and grandees at court, who spread a rumour that Teresa was a Muslim before she became a Christian. They disgraced her to the Shah, and it was reportedly published in the court that he intended to execute her by burning. Fifteen days after hearing the report, Robert died of fever on 13 July 1628 in Qazvin. According to his wishes, he was buried in the Discalced Carmelite church in Isfahan. The Shah summoned Teresa, asking her why the grandees were so opposed to her. She remained silent to protect them; according to contemporaneous accounts, the Shah advised her not to be afraid, "because it would be harder for him to put one woman to death than a hundred men". Some of his corrupt officials plundered her wealth. Teresa reportedly became seriously ill, and was moved to Isfahan to receive the sacraments from the priests; she recovered and decided to move to a Christian land.

In the Safavid Empire, women were prohibited from travelling abroad without permission. So the Carmelites in Isfahan asked the governor of Shiraz, Emamqoli Khan, son of the celebrated Allahverdi Khan (one of Abbas's closest associates), for consent on Teresa's behalf. A favourite of Emamqoli Khan wanted to marry Teresa, and reminded the governor of the report that she had been a Muslim before she was a Christian. She was ordered to appear before a mullah (a religious judge) in a mosque, who would question her about her past and her religion. This was unacceptable to the Carmelites, who asked the governor to have Teresa questioned in the church of the Carmelite fathers. The mullah rejected this, but an agreement was reached that they would meet in the home of a steward of the governor of Shiraz, who was a friend of the Carmelite Fathers. She was questioned for an hour before she was allowed to return home.

Safavid Iran was disturbed by the death of Shah Abbas a few months after Shirley's death. Abbas's grandson, Safi (1629–1642), succeeded him; he was less consistent than his grandfather in his religious tolerance. The favourite of Emamqoli Khan, who still wanted to marry Teresa, sent his servants to the Carmelites in Isfahan to capture her. The priests denied knowing her whereabouts, and advised her to take refuge in the Church of Saint Augustine in New Julfa (the Armenian quarter in Isfahan). The priests were brought to the favourite's house and reportedly threatened with torture before they were released.

The mullah asked Emamqoli Khan for permission to question Teresa again. Since he favoured the Carmelite Fathers, and did not want to insult the mullah, he said that the matter concerned Isfahan prefect (darugha) Khosrow Mirza. The prefect, like the governor of Shiraz, was also a Georgian. He had Teresa arrested and brought before him; a judge questioned her about her religion. She professed her Christianity, reportedly saying that she would die "a thousand times" for it.
The judge accused her of lying and threatened to burn her alive if she did not convert to Islam. When Teresa refused, the judge threatened to have her thrown from a tower; she reportedly said that would suit her better, because she would die (and go to heaven) more quickly. According to the Carmelites, the judge was shamed by her reminder of Shirley's service. He ended the questioning and reported to the prefect of Isfahan who allowed Teresa to return to her house and had the mullah dismissed. The Carmelite Fathers received the necessary permission from the governor of Shiraz in September 1629. Teresa's departure was documented in a letter from Father Dimas in the Carmelite archives in Rome:

Three years after returning from her last trip, Teresa left her country of birth forever. She lived in Constantinople for three years, receiving a certificate from the commissary general of the Dominicans in the East on 21 June 1634 reportedly attesting to her pious conduct. Around that time, she decided to retire to a convent in Rome, which was attached to the Carmelite Santa Maria della Scala church.

Later life and death

On 27 December 1634 she arrived in Rome and was received kindly by Pope Urban VIII, who entrusted her to the Carmelites. Teresa bought a house next to the church. In 1658 she had Robert's remains transported from Isfahan to Rome, where he was reburied in the Santa Maria della Scala. In the Carmelite convent, she devoted herself to charity and religion until her death at age 79 in 1668. Teresa was buried in the church, where she had lived for forty years, in the same grave where she had buried her husband Robert ten years earlier.

She had the headstone inscribed: Deo Optimo Maximo Roberto Sherleyo Anglo Nobilissimo Comiti Cesareo Equiti Aurato Rodulfi II Imperatori Legato Ad Scia Abbam Regem Persarum et Eiusdeum Regis Secundo Ad Romanos Pontifices Imperatores Reges Hispaniae Angliae Poloniae Moscoviae Mogorri Aliosque Europae Principes Inclito Oratori. Theresia Sampsonia Amazonites Samphuffi Circassiae Principes Filia Viro Amatissimo et Sibi Posuit Illius Ossibus Suisque Laribus In Urbem E Perside Pietatis Ergo Translatis Annos Nata LXXIX MDCLXVIII (Translated as "To God, the Best and Greatest. For Robert Sherley, most noble Englishman, Count Palatine, Knight of the Golden Spur, Emperor Rudolph II's envoy to Shah Abbas, the King of Persia, (and) the representative of the same King to the Popes of Rome, to Emperors, to the Kings of Spain, England, Poland, Muscovy, and the Mogul Empire, distinguished ambassador to other European princes. Theresia Sampsonia, native of the land of the Amazons, daughter of Samphuffus, prince of Circassia, set up [this monument] for her most beloved husband and for herself, as a resting place for his bones—brought to Rome from Persia for dutiful devotion's sake—and for her own, aged seventy-nine. 1668.")

According to Bernadette Andrea (2017), the text demonstrates that Teresa subverted the patriarchal gender roles common to the Muslim and Christian cultures of her time.

In popular culture
The adventures of Teresa and her husband, and what Andrea calls their "hybrid identities", inspired a variety of literary and visual works. According to Manoutchehr Eskandari-Qajar, Shirley and his "exotic wife with an even more exotic life story" sparked a great deal of curiosity and interest among their contemporaries in the West. During her journeys between Persia and Europe, Teresa was remarked upon by contemporary writers, artists and European royal houses. Travel writer Thomas Herbert described Shirley as "the greatest Traveller of his time", but he admired the "undaunted Lady Teresa" even more, as one whose "faith was ever Christian". Teresa and her husband were invariably noted for their exotic garb. In every high-level meeting, Shirley appeared in his high-status Persian attire of silk and velvet. He was Persianized to such a degree that contemporary playwright and pamphleteer Thomas Middleton referred to him as the "famous English Persian".

Works inspired by the couple include two portraits by van Dyck, pamphlets in many languages, and Jacobean stage plays including The Travels of the Three English Brothers. Lady Mary Wroth's Urania was partly influenced by Teresia Sampsonia's travels to England with her husband. Tuson argues that Teresa's story has been overshadowed by "the partly self-created myth of the Shirley's", who became the main subject of many of the contemporary "biographies as well as subsequent historical studies". Carmen Nocentelli notes that the "figure of Teresa has been generally obscured by those of her male relatives". According to Nocentelli:

Nocentelli does add that the belittling of Teresa as a historic figure of importance was limited to England. Outside England, "Teresa Sampsonia Sherley was a figure of note in and of her own right". Contemporaneous Italian traveller Pietro della Valle referred to Teresa as an "Ambassadress of the King of Persia", which Nocentelli interprets as putting Teresa on an "equal footing with her husband". In 2009, in London, there were two simultaneous exhibitions which featured Teresa and her husband: Shah 'Abbas: The Remaking of Iran (British Museum, February to June 2009) and Van Dyck and Britain (Tate Britain, February to May 2009).

See also

 Circassians in Iran
 Portrait of Lady Theresa Shirley
 Peoples of the Caucasus in Iran

Notes

References

Bibliography

Further reading

 
 

1580s births
1668 deaths
Circassian nobility
Iranian people of Circassian descent
Iranian Roman Catholics
Iranian emigrants to Italy
Burials at Santa Maria della Scala
Converts to Roman Catholicism from Eastern Orthodoxy
16th-century people of Safavid Iran
17th-century people of Safavid Iran
17th-century Iranian women